Castellanos is a populated centre in the Canelones Department of southern Uruguay.

Geography

Location

Population
In 2011 Castellanos had a population of 520.
 
Source: Instituto Nacional de Estadística de Uruguay

References

External links
INE map of Castellanos

Populated places in the Canelones Department